Hilltown is an unincorporated community in Hilltown Township in Bucks County, Pennsylvania, United States. Hilltown is located at the intersection of Pennsylvania Route 152 and Broad Street.

References

Unincorporated communities in Bucks County, Pennsylvania
Unincorporated communities in Pennsylvania